Serq may refer to:
 Isis, Egyptian goddess
 Şərq, Azerbaijan
 SerQ, SerQ Technologies Private Limited - Software and Web Development Company in India